The 2015 PBA All-Star Weekend, also known as the 2015 Smart-PBA All-Star for sponsorship reasons, was the annual all-star weekend of the Philippine Basketball Association (PBA)'s 2014–15 season. The events were held at the Puerto Princesa Coliseum in Puerto Princesa, Palawan. This was the second time that Puerto Princesa hosted the all-star weekend. Highlighting the weekend was the return of the North vs. South format of the All-Star game.

All-Star Weekend (Friday events)

Rookies vs. Sophomores game
The Rookies vs. Sophomores game was the main attraction for the Friday events. The last edition of this event was held in 2011. The following rules were observed during the game:
The game consists of four 10-minute quarters. The time will be running during dead ball situations except for the last two minutes of each quarter.
The shot clock is reduced to 18 seconds.
The time limit for a team to advance the ball over the center line is reduced to six seconds.
No players will be fouled out. However, after the seventh personal foul of the player, the team will be put automatically to penalty.
Two free throws will be given to a player who was fouled if it is not act of shooting, three free throws if it is from a missed shot, four free throws if the missed shot came from the three-point area.
One timeout is given to each team for the first to third quarters and two timeouts are given to each team for the fourth quarter. Also, the teams will have a thirty-second timeout for each half.
Dunks are scored as three points.

Game

Obstacle Challenge

Gold represent the current champion.
Jeric Fortuna won in this year's Obstacle Challenge

Three-Point Contest

Gold represent current champion.
Terrence Romeo won in this year's Three Point Shootout

Slam Dunk Contest

Gold represent the current champion.
Rey Guevarra won in this event, earning his second consecutive title.

 Canaleta did not participate due to a worn-out knee.
 Ellis did not participate due to a swollen ankle injury.

All-Star Game

Coaches
Leo Austria, coach of the San Miguel Beermen, and Alex Compton, coach of the Alaska Aces, were selected as the North and the South head coach, respectively. As with the past All-Star Games, the coaches of the teams who entered the season's Philippine Cup Finals will coach the all-star teams.

Roster
The rosters for the All-Star Game were chosen in two ways. The starters were chosen via a fan ballot (online and at the venue during PBA games). Players are assigned to represent the North or South All-Star teams based from their place of birth. Players born in Luzon are assigned to the North All-Stars team while players born in Visayas and Mindanao are assigned to represent the South All-Stars. If the player is born outside the Philippines, the player is assigned to his parents' birthplace. Two guards and three frontcourt players who received the highest vote were named the All-Star starters. The reserves are voted by the twelve PBA coaches after the results of the fan ballot are released.

June Mar Fajardo of the San Miguel Beermen received the most number of fan ballots with 38,107 votes, which earned him a starting position as a center/forward in the South All-Stars team. Asi Taulava of the NLEX Road Warriors earned a record 13th All-Star selection. Taulava, Greg Slaughter, James Yap and Mark Barroca completed the South All-Stars.

The North All-Stars' leading vote-getter was Purefoods Star Hotshots' Marc Pingris, who finished with 23,947. Japeth Aguilar, Mark Caguioa, Justin Melton and Calvin Abueva completed the starting position for the North All-Stars.

Jimmy Alapag, who announced his retirement on January 9, 2015 has been added as the 13th man of the South All-Stars by PBA commissioner Chito Salud. He is the current team manager of his former team, the Talk 'N Text Tropang Texters. The retirement of his #3 jersey by Talk 'N Text is also scheduled to be held during the All-Star game.

INJCaguioa, Hontiveros and Fajardo were unable to participate due to injury.
 Alapag played for Talk 'N Text in the Philippine Cup. He now serves as its team manager.
 Jayson Castro started in place of Mark Caguioa
 Joe Devance started in place of June Mar Fajardo
REP1 Tenorio was named as Caguioa's replacement

Game

See also
2014–15 PBA season
Philippine Basketball Association
Philippine Basketball Association All-Star Weekend

References

Philippine Basketball Association All-Star Weekend
All-Star Weekend
Sports in Palawan